Soe (sometimes seen as SoE) is the administrative capital of the South Central Timor Regency, in East Nusa Tenggara province of Indonesia. Soe is located on Timor Island.

It was heavily bombed in 1944 during the second world war 

Water supplies for the locality have been a problem for a considerable time, despite aid to assist with dams and other means of finding water 

The town has population of 40,190 at the 2020 Census, the official estimate as at mid 2021 was 40,532.

Soe can be a base for tourists for trips to other locations. Oinlasi, Boti, Niki Niki and Kapan are reachable from Soe.

It is on the route (via Kapan) to the highest mountain in West Timor Mount Mutis.

References

Geography of West Timor
Populated places in East Nusa Tenggara
Regency seats of East Nusa Tenggara
West Timor